The Selgdarsky mine is a large mine located in the Sakha Republic. Selgdarsky represents one of the largest phosphates reserve in Russia having estimated reserves of 3 billion tonnes of ore grading 35.5% P2O5.

References 

Phosphate mines in Russia